Dead Forever... is the debut album by Australian rock band Buffalo, recorded and originally released in 1972. 

The album was remastered and reissued in March 2006 by Australian record label Aztec Music on CD with additional tracks, including an A-side and B-side released by the pre-Buffalo outfit Head.

Track listing

2006 Aztec Music Reissue Bonus Tracks

Personnel
 Dave Tice – co-lead vocals
 Alan Milano – co-lead vocals
 Peter Wells – bass
 John Baxter – guitar
 Paul Balbi – drums

References

Buffalo (band) albums
1972 albums
Vertigo Records albums